Igloolik (Inuktitut syllabics: , Iglulik) is an Inuit hamlet in Foxe Basin, Qikiqtaaluk Region in Nunavut, northern Canada. Because its location on Igloolik Island is close to Melville Peninsula, it is often mistakenly thought to be on the peninsula. The name "Igloolik" means "there is a house here". It derives from  meaning house or building, and refers to the sod houses that were originally in the area, not to snow igloos. In Inuktitut the residents are called Iglulingmiut (the suffix miut means "people of").

History

Information about the area’s earliest inhabitants comes mainly from numerous archaeological sites on the island; some dating back more than 4,000 years. First contact with Europeans came when the British Royal Navy ships HMS Fury and HMS Hecla, under the command of Captain William Edward Parry, wintered in Igloolik in 1822.

The island was visited in 1867 and 1868 by the American explorer Charles Francis Hall in his search for survivors of the lost Franklin Expedition. In 1913, Alfred Tremblay, a French-Canadian prospector with Captain Joseph-Elzéar Bernier’s expedition to Pond Inlet, extended his mineral exploration overland to Igloolik, and in 1921 a member of Knud Rasmussen’a Fifth Thule Expedition visited the island.

The first permanent presence by southerners in Igloolik came with the establishment of a Roman Catholic Mission in the 1930s. By the end of the decade, the Hudson's Bay Company had also set up a post on the island.

Non-indigenous establishments, such as Royal Canadian Mounted Police (RCMP) stations, day schools, and clinics, were here before they came to be in surrounding communities. The Igloolik Research Centre focuses on documenting Inuit traditional knowledge and technology, as well as climatology and seismic data research.

Culture
Anthropologically, Iglulik Inuit are usually considered to be the Iglulingmiut, the Aivilingmiut, and the Tununirmiut, the Inuit from northern Baffin Island, on Southampton Island, and in the Melville Peninsula.

An ancient legend from the Igloolik area was adapted by Zacharias Kunuk into the award-winning Canadian film Atanarjuat: The Fast Runner in 2001. In 2004, Isuma produced the film The Journals of Knud Rasmussen which was released in September 2006 after premiering at the Toronto International Film Festival.

Igloolik is also the home-base of the only Inuit circus, Artcirq. This collective is active in video-making, music production and live circus show performances. In February 2010, six members of Artcirq represented Nunavut in performances at the 2010 Olympic Winter Games in Vancouver, British Columbia.

In late 2007, the Igloolik Hunters and Trappers Organization (HTO) banned all forms of tourism (sport hunting, filming, photography, watching) related to the northern Foxe Basin walrus population for a period of two years. This ban was in response to an observed decrease in walrus. The Igloolik Inuit continued to harvest walrus while the tourism ban was in place.

In 2017, documentary film maker Alan Zweig released There Is a House Here, a documentary film about his visits to the community.

Demographics

Environmental concerns

The Canadian Broadcasting Corporation interviewed people from the region in April 2008, about their concerns over plans to ship iron ore from the nearby Steensby Inlet on Baffin Island from the Baffinland Iron Mine.
Jaypetee Palluq, an Igloolik resident who had been asked to serve on a Baffinland advisory committee, was concerned that the mine's operation would interfere with the traditional hunts for sea mammals, like walrus. He called on Baffinland to "find an alternate shipping route to the mine, regardless of the cost."

Paul Quassa, former mayor of Igloolik, also expressed concern, over the effect of freighters on the ice used by the walrus. He said the region was known for its highly prized aged, fermented walrus meat, a valuable export from the region.

On November 2, 2016, CBC News reported that residents were describing a hum or buzz, coming from deep within the Fury and Hecla Strait—near Steensby Inlet where Baffinland has one of its ports.

Paul Quassa, Igloolik's representative to the Legislative Assembly of Nunavut, said the hum had been disturbing the sea mammals community members rely on for food. The hum is very loud, so loud the complement of vessels transiting the straits can hear it transmitted through the hulls, without any electronic aids. The Royal Canadian Air Force sent a Lockheed CP-140 Aurora to the area but were unable to detect the noise or the source.

Climate
Igloolik has a polar climate (ET) with nine months averaging below . Winters are long and cold, with October being the snowiest month. Summers range from chilly to sometimes mild, with cold nights.

Broadband communications 
The community has been served by the Qiniq network since 2005. Qiniq is a fixed wireless service to homes and businesses, connecting to the outside world via a satellite backbone. The Qiniq network is designed and operated by SSI Micro. In 2017, the network was upgraded to 4G LTE technology, and 2G-GSM for mobile voice.

Transportation
The community is served by the Igloolik Airport.

Notable people
 Germaine Arnaktauyok (born 1946), artist
 Levi Barnabas (born 1964), politician
 Lori Idlout, Member of the Canadian Parliament for Nunavut
 Northern Haze, rock band
 Annabella Piugattuk (born 1982), actress
 Paul Quassa, Premier of Nunavut (2017–2018)
 Aua, spiritual leader
 Kelly Fraser (1993–2019), singer-songwriter
 Terry Uyarak, singer-songwriter

Gallery

See also
List of municipalities in Nunavut
Kayak angst

References

Further reading

Allen, Kristiann. Negotiating Health The Meanings and Implications of Building a Healthy Community in Igloolik, Nunavut. Ottawa: National Library of Canada = Bibliothèque nationale du Canada, 2002. 
Aporta, Claudio. Old Routes, New Trails Contemporary Inuit Travel and Orienting in Igloolik, Nunavut. Ottawa: National Library of Canada = Bibliothèque nationale du Canada, 2004. 
Dredge, L. A. The Geology of the Igloolik Island Area, and Sea Level Changes. Yellowknife, N.W.T.: Science Institute of the Northwest Territories, 1992.
Ford, James D., Barry Smit, Johanna Wandel, and John MacDonald. 2006. "Vulnerability to Climate Change in Igloolik, Nunavut: What We Can Learn from the Past and Present". Polar Record (journal). 42, no. 2: 127-138.
Leontowich, Kent. A Study of the Benthic Faunal Distribution in the Subtidal Zone of Turton Bay, Igloolik Island, Nunavut. Ottawa: National Library of Canada = Bibliothèque nationale du Canada, 2005. 
Niwranski, K., P. G. Kevan, and A. Fjellberg. 2002. "Effects of Vehicle Disturbance and Soil Compaction on Arctic Collembolan Abundance and Diversity on Igloolik Island, Nunavut, Canada". European Journal of Soil Biology. 38, no. 2: 193-196.
Wachowich, Nancy. Making a Living, Making a Life Subsistence and the Re-Enactment of Iglulingmiut Cultural Practices. Vancouver: University of British Columbia, 2001.

External links

Populated places in Arctic Canada
Hudson's Bay Company trading posts in Nunavut
Hamlets in the Qikiqtaaluk Region
Road-inaccessible communities of Nunavut